Frederick G. Suerig (June 21, 1878 – December 8, 1929) was an American rower who competed in the 1904 Summer Olympics. He was born in Missouri and died in St. Louis, Missouri. In 1904 he was part of the American boat, which won the silver medal in the coxless fours.

References

External links
 profile

1878 births
1929 deaths
American male rowers
Rowers at the 1904 Summer Olympics
Olympic silver medalists for the United States in rowing
Medalists at the 1904 Summer Olympics